Dale Conrad Banton (born 15 May 1961) is an English former footballer who played as a striker.

Career
Born in Kensington, London, grow up in Wembley attending Alperton High School, then going on to play for West Ham United, Aldershot (scoring 47 goals in 106 appearances) and York City before finishing his career with Goole Town. He won the York City Clubman of the Year Award for the 1987–88 season.

References

1961 births
Living people
Footballers from Kensington
Black British sportspeople
English footballers
Association football forwards
West Ham United F.C. players
Aldershot F.C. players
York City F.C. players
Walsall F.C. players
Grimsby Town F.C. players
Goole Town F.C. players
English Football League players